Events from the year 1705 in Denmark.

Incumbents
 Monarch – Frederick IV
 Grand Chancellor – Conrad von Reventlow

Events

Undated
 The present Farumgård main building is constructed.
 Staldmestergården on Slotsholmen in Copenhagen is constructed.

Births
 8 Narch  Margrethe Marie Thomasine Numsen, courtier (died 1776)
 May  Ambrosius Stub, poet (died 1758)
 13 May – Johan Lorentz Castenschiold, merchant and landowner (died 1745)

Full date missing
 Margrethe Marie Thomasine Numsen, court official.

Deaths
 23 November  Prince William of Denmark, prince of Denmark (born 16687)

References

 
1700s in Denmark
Denmark
Years of the 18th century in Denmark